Omostropus is a genus of beetles in the family Carabidae, containing the following species:

 Omostropus australis Basilewsky, 1946
 Omostropus cratognathoides (Chaudoir, 1876)
 Omostropus kilimanus Basilewsky, 1946
 Omostropus mandibularis (Roth, 1851)
 Omostropus minor Basilewsky, 1948
 Omostropus rotundatus Clarke, 1973
 Omostropus similis Peringuey, 1896
 Omostropus tersulus Peringuey, 1896
 Omostropus vicarius Peringuey, 1896

References

Harpalinae